Virginia M. Tezak (May 22, 1928 - July 27, 2013), later Papesh, was a right-handed utility player in the All-American Girls Professional Baseball League. She played in four games for the Racine Belles in 1948, going hitless in seven at-bats.

She was born in Joliet, Illinois, was a graduate of Joliet Township High School and attended Joliet Junior College. She died in Joliet.

References

1928 births
2013 deaths
All-American Girls Professional Baseball League players
Baseball players from Illinois
21st-century American women